Prodyscherus is a genus of beetles in the family Carabidae, containing the following species:

 Prodyscherus alluaudi (Bänninger, 1934)
 Prodyscherus androyanus Jeannel, 1946, 1946
 Prodyscherus anosyensis Basilewsky, 1972
 Prodyscherus australis Jeannel, 1946
 Prodyscherus basilewskyi Bulirsch, Janák & P. Moravec, 2005
 Prodyscherus curtipennis (Fairmaire, 1901)
 Prodyscherus decaryi Jeannel, 1946
 Prodyscherus externus (Fairmaire, 1901)
 Prodyscherus grandidieri Jeannel, 1946
 Prodyscherus granulatus Jeannel, 1946
 Prodyscherus mandibularis (Fairmaire, 1901)
 Prodyscherus meridionalis Jeannel, 1955
 Prodyscherus morondavae Basilewsky, 1976
 Prodyscherus nigrita (Bänninger, 1934)
 Prodyscherus ovatus (Bänninger, 1934)
 Prodyscherus pluto (Künckel, 1887)
 Prodyscherus praelongus (Fairmaire, 1898)
 Prodyscherus pseudomandibularis (Bänninger, 1934)
 Prodyscherus rapax (Fairmaire, 1883)
 Prodyscherus rugatus (Bänninger, 1934)
 Prodyscherus sexiessetosus Jeannel, 1946

References

Scaritinae